Accons is a commune in the Ardèche department in the Auvergne-Rhône-Alpes region of southern France.
The inhabitants are called Acconnais or Acconnaises.

Geography
Accons is located in the arrondissement of Tournon-sur-Rhone and the canton of Haut-Eyrieux, 4 km south-west of Le Cheylard and some 50 km south-east of Le Puy-en-Velay. The only road into Accons is the D578 running west from Le Cheylard and continuing to Mariac. Accons village is accessed by the Accons road or La Mothe road which both branch off the D578. In the north of the commune is the hamlet of Villebrion which is also accessed by small mountain roads.

The Dorne river crosses the commune from west to east north of the village as it flows east to join the Eyrieux at Le Cheylard. Many tributaries feed the Dorne from the commune: in the north the Ruisseau des Combes forms the western border as it flows south to join the Dorne; in the south many streams flow north to join the Dorne including the Ruisseau de Praderne which forms part of the western border before joining the Dorne and the Ruisseau de Boure flows north through the centre of the commune.

Neighbouring Communes

Administration

List of Successive Mayors of Accons

Population

Sites and Monuments
The Château de la Mothe: a 15th to 16th century church with an attractive bell tower.

See also
Communes of the Ardèche department

References

External links

Accons official website 
Accons on the old IGN website 
Accons on Géoportail, National Geographic Institute (IGN) website 
Accons on the 1750 Cassini Map

Communes of Ardèche
Vivarais